Melodifestivalen 2002 was the selection for the 42nd song to represent Sweden at the Eurovision Song Contest. It was the 41st time that this system of picking a song had been used. Five heats had taken place to select the ten songs for the final, in Växjö, Norrköping, Sundsvall, Falun and a Second Chance round in Stockholm. The final was broadcast on SVT1 and Sveriges Radio's P4 network. The introduction of the heats and the allowance of songs in English resulted in a marked increase in voters. The final was watched by 3,720,000 people, with 926,318 votes cast in the final.

Schedule

Heats
The heats for Melodifestivalen 2002 began on 19 January 2002. Ten songs from these heats qualified for the final on 1 March 2002. This was the first year that a heat format had been used for the competition. This was the first year that songs were permitted in languages other than Swedish, resulting in a significant number of English language songs, and two songs with lyrics in Spanish. "Ett vackert par", composed by Py Bäckman and Micke Wennborn was disqualified before the competition, when the dance band Grönwalls had performed it on the radio before the contest (not knowing it was supposed to enter). Nanne Grönvall and Nick Borgen was thought as possible performers. It was replaced by "Sista andetaget".

Heat 1

Heat 2

Heat 3

Heat 4

Winners' Choice

Final

Voting

Juries

Televotes

Returning artists

See also
Eurovision Song Contest 2002
Sweden in the Eurovision Song Contest
Sweden in the Eurovision Song Contest 2002

External links
Melodifestivalen at SVT's open archive

2002 in Swedish music
2002 Swedish television seasons
2002
Eurovision Song Contest 2002
2002 song contests
February 2002 events in Europe
March 2002 events in Europe
January 2002 events in Europe
Events in Växjö
Events in Sundsvall
Events in Norrköping
Events in Falun
Events in Stockholm
2000s in Stockholm
2000s in Gothenburg